Jaideep Srivastava is a professor of Computer Science at the University of Minnesota.

He is a Fellow of the Institute of Electrical and Electronics Engineers (IEEE) and was awarded the Distinguished Research Contributions Award of the PAKDD, for his lifetime contributions to the field of data mining. Previously, he was the director of Social Computing group at QCRI. He has a Bachelor's of Technology from the Indian Institute of Technology (IIT) Kanpur in India. He has a Masters and PhD from the University of California, Berkeley. He was one of the principal investigators of the Virtual Worlds Observatory project along with Noshir Contractor, Marshall Scott Poole and Dmitri Williams. He received the IBM faculty award in 2002 and became an IEEE Fellow in 2004. In 2011 he co-founded Ninja Metrics with USC Professor Dmitri Williams and was assisted by Kyong Jin Shim, Nishith Pathak, Muhammad Aurangzeb Ahmad and Senthil Krishnamoorthy.
In 2021, Guide2Research ranked him as one of the top 1,000 researchers in Computer Science.

References

External links

Database researchers
Fellow Members of the IEEE
University of Minnesota faculty
University of California, Berkeley alumni
IIT Kanpur alumni
Indian emigrants to the United States
People from Lucknow
1959 births
Living people